The 2020–21 season is Wydad AC's 81st season in their existence and the club's 65th consecutive season in the top flight of Moroccan football. Wydad participated in this season's edition of the Botola, the Champions League and the Throne Cup.

Players

First-team squad

Transfers

In

Out

Competitions

Overview

{| class="wikitable" style="text-align: center"
|-
!rowspan=2|Competition
!colspan=8|Record
!rowspan=2|Started round
!rowspan=2|Final position / round
!rowspan=2|First match
!rowspan=2|Last match
|-
!
!
!
!
!
!
!
!
|-
| Botola

| Matchday 1
| style="background:gold;"| Winners
| 6 December 2020
| 28 July 2021
|-
| Throne Cup

| Round of 32
| Semi-finals
| 30 December 2020
| 1 August 2021
|-
| Champions League

| First round
| Semi-finals
| 23 December 2020
| 26 June 2021
|-
! Total

Botola

League table

Results summary

Results by round

Matches
Unless otherwise noted, all times in WAT

Moroccan Throne Cup

Champions League

First round

Group stage

Group C

Knockout stage

Quarter-finals

Semi-finals

Statistics 

|-
! colspan=14 style=background:#dcdcdc; text-align:center| Goalkeepers

|-
! colspan=14 style=background:#dcdcdc; text-align:center| Defenders

|-
! colspan=14 style=background:#dcdcdc; text-align:center| Midfielders

|-
! colspan=14 style=background:#dcdcdc; text-align:center| Forwards

|-
! colspan=14 style=background:#dcdcdc; text-align:center| Players transferred out during the season

Goalscorers
Includes all competitive matches. The list is sorted alphabetically by surname when total goals are equal.

Notes

References

Wydad AC seasons
Wydad Casablanca
Wydad Casablanca